Lion's Heart is a 1972 Hong Kong film.

References

1972 films
Hong Kong action films
1970s action films
1970s Mandarin-language films
Films directed by Ting Shan-hsi
1970s Hong Kong films